Brigadier General Charles Gerhardt (March 19, 1863 – June 7, 1957) was a United States Army officer in the late 19th and early 20th centuries. He served in several conflicts, including the Sioux Wars and World War I. He is the father of Charles H. Gerhardt, who also served as an army general.

Military career
Gerhardt was born in Baltimore on March 19, 1863, to a family that had immigrated from Hesse in the early 1800s. He graduated from the United States Military Academy (USMA) at West Point, New York, in June 1887. Among his fellow classmates included several general officers of the future, such as Michael Joseph Lenihan, Ulysses G. McAlexander, Ernest Hinds, Nathaniel Fish McClure, William Weigel, Charles S. Farnsworth, James Theodore Dean, Mark L. Hersey, Herman Hall, Frank Herman Albright, Marcus Daniel Cronin, George Owen Squier, Thomas Grafton Hanson, George Washington Gatchell, Alexander Lucian Dade and Edmund Wittenmyer.

Gerhardt was commissioned into the 20th Infantry Regiment, located in Montana at the time. After participating in the Sioux Wars from 1890 to 1891, Gerhardt worked as a professor of military science and tactics at Cumberland University from 1894 to 1897. During this time, he served as a secretary of the civilian organization U.S. Military Wheelmen. After serving in Cuba from 1899 to 1900, Gerhardt went to Minnesota and Montana. He went to Fort Gibbon in 1902, serving there for two years, and after staying in Baltimore, he was stationed in Columbus, Ohio. Gerhardt then served in the Philippines from 1906 to 1908, holding a command at Iloilo for a year.

Gerhardt graduated from the United States Army War College in 1913. That same year, he served as an instructor at the student camp at Gettysburg. After serving at the Panama Canal Zone for 18 months, Gerhardt worked at the Militia Bureau in Washington, D.C. He led the 4th Infantry Division from Camp Greene to Fort Stuart in Virginia before taking it to France because of World War I. In France, he commanded the Intermediate Section, Service of Supply, and Base Section Number Seven. After his promotion to the rank of brigadier general on April 12, 1918, Gerhardt served on the front lines with the 35th Infantry Division, and he then commanded the 183rd Brigade of the 92nd Division. The 183rd Brigade's adjutant was Albert E. Brown, later a major general during World War II.

After returning to the U.S., Gerhardt did demobilization work, commanding the 161st Depot Brigade at Camp Grant and later commanded the 16th Infantry Regiment from September 1922 until September 1924. Though he retired as a colonel in 1927, Congress restored his brigadier general rank in June 1930. He died at the age of 94 in Mendham Borough, New Jersey, on June 7, 1957. He is buried at Arlington National Cemetery.

Personal life
Gerhardt married Kate Watkins, and they had two children together, including Charles H. Gerhardt. He was known as "a very prolific writer who wrote about a great variety of subjects." The younger Charles Gerhardt would, like his father, attend the United States Military Academy, graduating from there in 1917 and eventually rose to the rank of major general and commanded the 29th Infantry Division during the Normandy landings of World War II.

References

Bibliography

1863 births
1957 deaths
Military personnel from Baltimore
People from Mendham Borough, New Jersey
United States Army generals of World War I
United States Military Academy alumni
United States Army War College alumni
Burials at Arlington National Cemetery
United States Army generals
Cumberland University faculty
Military personnel from New Jersey
United States Army Infantry Branch personnel